The Mayor of Moscow is the head and the highest-ranking official of Moscow, who leads the Government of Moscow, the main executive body of the city.

Moscow is both a city and separate federal subject, according to the Constitution of Russia. Most federal subjects are headed by governors, but the office of the head of Moscow is called Mayor of the City of Moscow, according to the Charter of the city of Moscow.

Sergey Sobyanin, the incumbent Mayor of Moscow, was re-elected for a new term in 2018.

Responsibilities

The separate office of the Premier of the Government of Moscow existed in 1991-2001 (Yuri Luzhkov was the only officeholder), but it was merged with the office of Mayor of Moscow. 1999 Moscow mayoral election was the last time when the mayor ran together with the vice-mayor.

Mayor of Moscow heads Government of Moscow. The mayor's office administers all city services, public property, police and fire protection, most public agencies, and enforces all city and state laws within Moscow. The mayor's office is located in Tverskaya Street and has jurisdiction over all districts of the City of Moscow. The mayor appoints deputy mayors, directors (heads of city departments) and other officials.

The Government of Moscow's budget is the largest regional budget in Russia.

Elections

The position of Mayor of Moscow was elected between 1991 and 2004. In 2004, Vladimir Putin suggested a law to abolish direct elections of governors, the Moscow mayor, and presidents of Russian regions. The law was swiftly adopted by the parliament.  The new legislation moved the election system to an indirect one in which parliamentary political parties and the President of Russia nominated a candidate who must then have been approved by the Moscow City Duma. Following the 2011–13 Russian protests which followed the 2011 parliamentary election, President Dmitry Medvedev offered to re-introduce the direct elections of the governors and the mayor of Moscow, and  corresponding legislation was approved by the Parliament. In the 2013 mayoral election, for the first time in 10 years, mayor was chosen by a popular vote.

A candidate to the office must be citizen of the Russian Federation over the age of 30. Candidates can be nominated both by political parties and as self-nomination. In any case, candidates must pass the "municipal filter" (collection of signatures of municipal deputies).

Latest election

Sergey Sobyanin was re-elected for a new term in 2018.

Mayors of Moscow (1991–present)

Previous heads of Moscow government

Chairpersons of the Executive Committee (1917–1991)

Latest election

|- style="background-color:#E9E9E9;text-align:center;"
! style="text-align:left;" colspan="2"| Candidate
! style="text-align:left;" colspan="2"| Party
! width="75"|Votes
! width="30"|%
|-
| style="background-color:;"|
| style="text-align:left;"| Sergey Sobyanin
| style="text-align:left;" colspan="2"| Independent
| 
| 70.17
|-
| style="background-color:;"|
| style="text-align:left;"| Vadim Kumin
| style="text-align:left;"| Communist Party
| CPRF
| 
| 11.38
|-
| style="background-color:;"|
| style="text-align:left;"| Ilya Sviridov
| style="text-align:left;"| A Just Russia
| JR
| 
| 7.01
|-
| style="background-color:;"|
| style="text-align:left;"| Mikhail Degtyarev
| style="text-align:left;"| Liberal Democratic Party
| LDPR
| 
| 6.72
|-
|bgcolor=#287319|
| style="text-align:left;"| Mikhail Balakin
| style="text-align:left;"| Union of Citizens
|UC
| 
| 1.87
|-
| style="background-color:#E9E9E9;" colspan="6"|
|- style="font-weight:bold"
| style="text-align:left;" colspan="4"| Total
| 
|100.00
|-
| style="background-color:#E9E9E9;" colspan="6"|
|-
| style="text-align:left;" colspan="4"| Valid votes
| 
| 97.15
|-
| style="text-align:left;" colspan="4"| Blank ballots
| 
| 2.85
|-
| style="text-align:left;" colspan="4"| Turnout
| 
| 30.91
|-
| style="text-align:left;" colspan="4"| Registered voters
| 
| style="background-color:#E9E9E9;"|
|-
| style="background-color:#E9E9E9;" colspan="6"|
|-
| style="text-align:left;font-size:90%;" colspan="6"|
Official results published by the Moscow City Electoral Commission 
|}

See also
Governor of Saint Petersburg
Governor of Sevastopol (Russia)
Government of Moscow
Moscow City Police

References

External links
Official Website

 
Government of Moscow
Moscow
Moscow
1991 establishments in Russia